Demetre is an Old Greek male name.

Examples

Demetre Chiparus
Demetre II of Georgia
Demetre I of Georgia	
Demetre Kantemir	
Demetre of Guria	
Demetres Koutsavlakis
Demetrescu-Tradem

External links 
 Etymology of Demetre
 Etymology of Demetre
 Etymology of St. Demetre

Greek masculine given names